Denver Diamonds was an American women's soccer team, founded in 1996. In its debut season the team won its USL W-League conference, then finished second four years in succession, before folding after the 2000 season. The team was later a member of the Women's Premier Soccer League, the second tier of women's soccer in the United States and Canada. Starting play in the 2002 season, they went on hiatus in 2005, then folded again after the 2009 season.

The team played its home games at the Gates Soccer Complex in the city of Centennial, Colorado, 15 miles south of downtown Denver. The club's colors were white and black.

Players

Notable former players
  Homare Sawa
  Dayna Smith

Year-by-year

Honors
 W-League West Region Champions 1996
 WPSL Southern Southwest Division Champions 2007
 WPSL Southern Southwest Division Champions 2006

Competition history

Coaches
  Tom Stone (1996–2000)
  Scott De Dycker

Stadia
 Gates Soccer Complex in Centennial, Colorado

References

External links
 WPSL Denver Diamonds page
 SoccerTimes.com W-League page

Women's Premier Soccer League teams
Women's soccer clubs in Colorado
Soccer clubs in Denver
Soccer clubs in Colorado
2005 establishments in Colorado
Association football clubs established in 2005